Rudolf Berenberg (born 1680, died 1746) was a Hamburg merchant and banker and a member of the Berenberg banking family. He served as President of the Commerz-Deputation 1728–1729 and as a Hamburg Senator from 1735. He was the son of Cornelius Berenberg, and was married to Anna Elisabeth Amsinck (1690–1748), a daughter of Paul Amsinck (1649–1706) and Christina Adelheid Capelle (1663–1730).

He was the father of
Rudolf Berenberg (1712–1761), merchant in Hamburg
Cornelius Berenberg (1714–1773), merchant in Livorno
Paul Berenberg (1716–1768), Senator, co-owner of Berenberg Bank
Johann Berenberg (1718–1772), co-owner and then sole owner of Berenberg Bank, married Anna Maria Lastrop (1723–1761)

Literature
Joh. Berenberg, Gossler & Co.: Die Geschichte eines deutschen Privatbankhauses, Berenberg Bank, Hamburg 1990
Percy Ernst Schramm, Neun Generationen: Dreihundert Jahre deutscher Kulturgeschichte im Lichte der Schicksale einer Hamburger Bürgerfamilie (1648–1948). Vol. I and II, Göttingen 1963/64.

German bankers
German merchants
Senators of Hamburg (before 1919)
Rudolf
Berenberg Bank people
Grand burghers of Hamburg
1680 births
1746 deaths
18th-century German businesspeople